Lancaster University Leipzig is a branch campus of Lancaster University. Established in 2020, it is the first public UK university with a campus in Germany.

Courses offered at the university include undergraduate degrees in management, computing and IT fields, a master's in logistics and supply chain management, and international foundation programmes in business and computer science.

Students who study and graduate in Leipzig receive their degree from Lancaster University in the United Kingdom.

History 
Lancaster University decided on Leipzig for its new campus location after evaluating numerous European cities, partially because of its high economic growth, growing student population and touristic appeal. This became the fourth campus overseas for the British university, which already had institutions in China, Ghana and Malaysia.

First students enrolled in January 2020, just before the COVID-19 pandemic. The university had to quickly transition to a hybrid mode that lasts until today, allowing students to join online if their visas are not approved by the time the course starts.

Lancaster University Leipzig has a diverse international student body with more than 45 nationalities. 50% of the students are originally from non-EU countries, 35% from other EU countries and 15% from Germany.

Campus 
The new campus is located in Strohsackpassage, in the center of Leipzig. The offices were renovated with the goal of providing a modern, hybrid-friendly education.

Education 
Language courses: All courses are taught in English. However, German courses (A1 level) are offered free of charge to non-German speaking students.  

Foundation programmes: Designed for students who do not meet the entry requirements for direct degree entry. 

 Foundation in Business
 Foundation in Computer Science

Undergraduate degrees:

 BSc (Hons) Accounting and Finance
 BSc (Hons) Business Management
 BSc (Hons) Computer Science
 BSc (Hons) Software Engineering

Postgraduate degrees:

 Pre-Masters in Business
 Pre-Masters Computer Science
 MSc in Logistics and Supply Chain Management
 MSc Management
 MSc Data Science
 MSc Cyber Security

Lancaster University Leipzig charges tuition fees that are generally lower than the international fees for the same degrees delivered on the UK campus. The institution partners with Chancen eG, an organisation that offers financing of tuition fees with an income-share agreement.

References 

Universities in Germany
Private universities and colleges in Germany
2020 establishments in Germany

de:Lancaster University Leipzig